Ceratosoma gracillimum is a species of sea slug or dorid nudibranch, a marine gastropod mollusk in the family Chromodorididae.

Distribution 
This species was described from Bohol, Philippines. It is known from Indonesia, Vietnam and the Great Barrier Reef, Australia.

Description

Ecology

References

Chromodorididae
Gastropods described in 1876